Juan Manuel Battaglia (born 11 June 1957) is a former football midfielder and forward.

Battaglia started his career in 1977, in Paraguayan side Nacional before moving to Cerro Porteño. He then was part of a ten-year-long career at Colombian club América de Cali, from 1984 to 1989, where he helped the team win several national championships and becoming a fan-favorite.

Titles as a player
Colombian championship: 1979, 1982, 1983, 1984, 1985, 1986 (with América de Cali)
Copa Libertadores runners-up: 1985, 1986, 1987 (with América de Cali)

References

External links

1957 births
Living people
Paraguayan footballers
Paraguay under-20 international footballers
Paraguay international footballers
Paraguayan expatriate footballers
Club Nacional footballers
Cerro Porteño players
América de Cali footballers
Paraguayan Primera División players
Categoría Primera A players
Paraguayan people of Italian descent
Expatriate footballers in Colombia
Paraguayan expatriate sportspeople in Colombia
Naturalized citizens of Colombia
Paraguayan emigrants to Colombia
Association football forwards
Club Nacional managers
Club Sol de América managers
Club Tacuary managers